Telugu Cinema Vythalikulu, (English: The Legends of Telugu Cinema) is a 2002 research book on Telugu cinema  persons like directors, actors, artists, producers and technicians, by film critic, writer and journalist Bulemoni Venkateshwarlu. The book is considered one of the major studies of Telugu Filmdom and film personalities between 1908 and 2002.

Publishing
The Telugu Cinema Vythalikulu was published by Nextstep Publications & Entertainments, Hyderabad.

Content
The book covers 142 film personalities from Telugu Cinema in the Silent Era (1908–1930), Early Tollywood (1931–1940), Golden Era (1941–1975), Commercial Culture in Telugu Cinema (1976–2002), and The Modern Era.

Awards
Telugu Cinema Vythalikulu was selected for  Nandi Awards from Government of Andhra Pradesh, India in 2002.

Nandi Award winners
2002 non-fiction books
Telugu cinema
Books about film